The Kattupalli Shipyard, officially Adani Katupalli Port Private Limited is a large shipyard project at Kattupalli village near Ennore in Chennai, being built by L&T Shipbuilding Ltd. It is being set up jointly by TIDCO and Larsen & Toubro (L&T) in two phases. L&T shipbuilding Kattupalli is a minor port. Adani ports and special economic zone (APSEZ) acquired Kattupalli Port from L&T in June 2018 and renamed it as Adani Katupalli Port Private Limited (AKPPL).

In terms of cargo generation, the terminal is located close to the majority of Container Freight stations in Chennai. The Kattupalli development also includes a shipyard being developed by L&T, a private sector–backed development.

It is planning to compete with Japanese and Korean shipyards in building "specialised ships," such as large-size warships, car carriers, submarines, naval offshore patrol vessels, fast patrol vessels and corvettes. After Colombo and Singapore, Kattupalli will be the third major international destination for ship repairs in the region.

The shipyard-cum-minor port complex was officially inaugurated on 30 January 2013.

Structure
The first development phase, which aims to be operational by January 2012, will have a 12 lakh (1.2 million) TEU capacity through two 350-metre-long L-shaped berths and a total terminal area of around 20 hectares. The berths would be operated by Philippines-based International Container Terminal Services Inc for 28 years. The terminal has an option to rise to 18 lakh (1.8 million) TEU capacity during the second phase of development.

Mobile equipment will include two reach stackers and one empty handler.

The yard will offer 5,000 ground slots and a CFS is also planned as part of the service package. Access to the terminal on the marine side is via a 3.5 km-long channel and port basin offering a draft of 14 m—the draft capability is such that it provides for projected increases in Southern Asian container trade. It also provides for the future possibility of mainline Asia–Europe vessels making a stop in Southern India, which has been mooted as a distinct possibility by certain analysts. Kattupalli's North and South breakwaters, which together total 3.35 km, ensure a safe harbour and uninterrupted terminal operations.

The yard has 3 rail-mounted quayside cranes (RMQCs) (arrived at the port in December 2011 from China), 15 rubber-tyred gantry cranes (RTGCs), two reach stackers and 420 reefer plug points. On 12 April 2012, the yard received Zhen Hua 20, a heavy lift vessel, with three more RMQCs to be installed at the second berth.

Engineering components hub
When fully completed, it will be the largest shipyard in Asia. Once operational, the shipyard will become a nucleus for heavy engineering industry (fabrications and components manufacturing). This would make Chennai a hub for engineering components. The project is being implemented in two phases with a total investment of about ₹4,675 crore. ₹3,050 crore will be invested in Phase I (2009–11), and the rest in Phase II (2012–15). MoU has been signed and the project has commenced.

Rail corridor
As of October 2019, a 6.08 km rail corridor to ferry cargo to the port is being built at a cost of ₹51.8 crore on a  area.

Proposed facilities
The Kattupalli yard is mainly built for making warships and to augment the existing capacity at Hazira in Gujarat for submarines. A draft of up to 14m and a waterfront exceeding 2.2 km makes the facility well suited to building large defence ships.

The Integrated shipyard complex will have the following facilities:

Commercial ship building including very large cargo carriers; specialised cargo ships for liquid/gas transportation and cruise vessels
Building of defense ships including submarines
 Off-shore platforms and floating production-cum-storage facility for oil and gas sector
Refitting and re-engineering of commercial and defence ships
Heavy engineering fabrication and components production for ship building.

At the yard, encompassing 1,250 acres, L&T has also commissioned facilities to build offshore platforms, drilling rigs and FPSOs (floating production, storage and offloading unit), besides a minor port which can handle container ships. An 18,000-tonne shiplift is being installed at the yard.

In the first phase, around ₹4,000 crore is being invested in the facility that will start rolling out ships by January 2012.

Project status
7 August 2009
 L&T scales down investment in the first phase to  15,000 million. Total investment in both phases of the project is ₹5,000 crore.

26 April 2010
 L&T arranges funds for Kattupalli project. The shipbuilding facility, billed as India's biggest, has got environmental clearance from the Government of India. The Tamil Nadu Government has allocated land for the shipyard complex.

14 Sep 2010
 India's biggest engineering and construction firm, L&T, will open a container terminal by January 2012 at Kattupalli, where it is also building a shipyard.

26 Sep 2010
 Engineering major L&T's shipping arm, L&T Shipbuilding Ltd (LTSB), has earmarked around 1,500 crore to develop around 800 acres of land at Kattupalli for expanding its vessel building capacity, a top company official said.

06 Apr 2011
 International Container Terminal Services Inc (ICTSI) said it has signed the contract with India's L&T Shipbuilding Ltd. for the container port operations for the Kattupalli Container Terminal in Tamil Nadu, India.

08 Jun 2011
 ICTSI has forged a deal with LTSB for the management and operation of the Kattupalli International Container Terminal (KICT) for a 28-year period – a term that is exceptionally long for this type of arrangement and which represents something of a first in the industry.

25 Jul 2011
 L&T Ship Building Ltd is likely to form a joint venture with Ennore Port Ltd and the  Industrial Development Corporation (TIDCO), to build a 25.5 km road that would connect Ennore Port and Kattupalli Port. The road project is estimated to cost ₹360 crore.

Jun 2015
 L&T Ship Building at Kattupalli is fully functional. 
Construction of New Build Projects: In 2015 L&T has bagged order for construction of 7 Offshore patrol vessels for the Indian Coast Guard and Floating Dock for the Indian Navy which will be designed in house at L&T Ship Design Centre. At commercial new build front L&T Shipbuilding is currently executing eight offshore vessels at Kattupalli Yard for Overseas Client. Presently L&T is executing a project for construction of 54 Interceptor Boats for the Indian Coast Guard. Designed in-house with waterjet propulsion and aluminium hull, these boats have a speed of over 45 knots and excellent manoeuvrability.

Design Centre: L&T Shipbuilding has a design centre with capability of in-house designing of Naval ships and submarines and has already developed basic designs of Interceptor Boats, Offshore Patrol Vessels, Corvettes etc. which can be adapted to customer requirements.  3D Modelling integrated with Product Lifecycle Management and other Design and Analysis software suites enable accuracy, revision control and output aligned with yard infrastructure.

Ship Repairs, Refits & Conversions: L&T Shipbuilding is geared to handle ship repairs, refits and conversions catering to commercial and Defence ships/submarines and offshore platforms. A shiplift of 200m x 46m with lifting capacity of 21,050 tonnes (future extension planned for larger vessels) along with transfer system and dry berths enables quick turnaround of ships. There are 4 wet berths of 260 / 200 metres length. Many refit projects have been successfully completed.

Jan 2016
Larsen & Toubro (L&T) to modernise Kilo-class submarines in its Kattapulli yard
Larsen & Tourbo (L&T), is gearing up to host a major modernisation plan of the Indian Navy. In an official letter to the Indian Government, a Russian shipyard has put forward its willingness to work alongside L&T. If all decks are cleared, L&T will play a major role in a planned ₹5,000 crore Kilo-class submarine modernisation plan of the Indian Navy.
L&T will accordingly upgrade three of the four remaining submarines in its Kattupalli shipyard

See also
 Chennai Port
 Ennore Port
 Ports in India

References

External links
Larsen & Toubro Limited, Engineering Construction & Contracts Division

Companies based in Chennai
Economy of Chennai
Shipbuilding companies of India
Ports and harbours of Tamil Nadu
2012 establishments in Tamil Nadu
Indian companies established in 2012